Picnic is a 1972 Indian Bengali film, written and directed by Inder Sen, based on a novel of the same name by Ramapada Chowdhury. It stars Archana, Dhritiman Chatterjee, Joyoshree Ray, Ranjit Mallick, Arati Bhattacharya and Samit Bhanja in the lead roal.

Cast
 Archana
 Dhritiman Chatterjee
 Joyoshree Ray
 Ranjit Mallick
 Arati Bhattacharya
 Samit Bhanja
 Chinmoy Roy

Filmscore
All the lyrics were co-written by Sudhin Dasgupta and Pulak Bandyopadhyay, where playback singing by Manna Dey and Asha Bhosle.

References

External links

1970s Bengali-language films
1972 drama films
1972 films
Indian drama films
Indian black-and-white films
Films based on Indian novels
Films based on works by Ramapada Chowdhury
Bengali-language Indian films